Christian Gabriel Bethancourt Ruiz (born September 2, 1991) is a Panamanian professional baseball catcher, first baseman for the Tampa Bay Rays of Major League Baseball (MLB). He has previously played in MLB for the Atlanta Braves, San Diego Padres, and Oakland Athletics, and in the KBO League for the NC Dinos.

Early life
Bethancourt was born and raised in Panama City, Panama where he began playing baseball at the age of five. As a third baseman, Bethancourt had a tendency to abandon his position in favor of wherever the ball was hit. His parents convinced him to move behind the plate, saying that if Bethancourt left his position as a catcher during a game, his team would lose, as the other team would find it easy to score.

Career

Minor leagues
Bethancourt was signed as a non-drafted international free agent and began his minor league career at the age of 16 in 2008. He was named the seventh-most-promising catching prospect in baseball by MLB.com prior to the 2012 season.

Bethancourt played for the Mississippi Braves of the Class AA Southern League in 2012. He was named to the All-Star Futures Game. On August 9, 2012, Bethancourt broke his left hand when he was hit with a pitch. The Braves added him to their 40-man roster after the 2012 season.

Bethancourt again played for Mississippi in 2013 and made his second All Star Futures Game roster. Following the end of the minor league season, he was promoted and joined the Atlanta Braves on September 9, 2013.  Bethancourt made his major league debut against the Philadelphia Phillies on September 29, 2013. He struck out in his only at bat.

Atlanta Braves

In 2014, Bethancourt began the year with the Gwinnett Braves of the Class AAA International League, and made his third consecutive All Star Futures Game on June 24. He was promoted to the major leagues when Evan Gattis went on the disabled list on June 28. He recorded his first major league RBI on July 1, against Daisuke Matsuzaka. Bethancourt batted .240 with the Braves in 13 games, and was demoted to the minor leagues on July 21, when Gattis was activated from the disabled list. He was to be promoted back to the Braves on September 2.

In spring training in 2015, the Braves said Bethancourt would have to be assessed before he would be given the position of primary catcher. On June 6, Bethancourt hit his first career home run in the bottom of the ninth inning, off of Vance Worley, to give the Braves a 5–4 victory over the Pittsburgh Pirates. Bethancourt appeared in 29 games for the Braves in early 2015, batting .208/.231/.297 with a .528 OPS and six passed balls, before being sent to back down to AAA Gwinnett on June 15 after he made a series of defensive mistakes and failed to hit. At the time, according to ESPN Stats he was ranked 66th out of 82 qualifiers in catcher's ERA (4.50). He also was ranked third among National League catchers in most passed balls and tied for fourth in errors (3) while playing in only 29 games. He was recalled on August 24. On October 5, Bethancourt underwent knee surgery for a torn meniscus.

San Diego Padres
On December 10, 2015, Bethancourt was traded to the San Diego Padres for right hander Casey Kelly and Ricardo Rodriguez. After spring training ended in April 2016, Bethancourt was named the backup to starting catcher Derek Norris. Bethancourt made his first career pitching appearance on May 31, a blowout loss against the Seattle Mariners, recording two outs, two walks, and a hit batsmen. He took the mound again on June 14, against the Miami Marlins, picking up his first strikeout as a pitcher, while yielding one hit and one walk in one inning. At the end of the season, Bethancourt returned to his home country to play in the Panamanian Professional Baseball League, where he saw playing time as a pitcher and position player.

On April 1, 2017, the Padres announced that Bethancourt would work primarily as a reliever, while also seeing duties as a catcher, outfielder, and pinch hitter. Bethancourt struggled in four relief appearances, and the Padres outrighted him off of their 40-man roster to the El Paso Chihuahuas of the Class AAA Pacific Coast League, where he continued pitching. He elected free agency on November 6, 2017.

Milwaukee Brewers
On January 8, 2018, Bethancourt signed a minor league deal with the Milwaukee Brewers. He was assigned to the team's Triple-A affiliate, the Colorado Springs Sky Sox, for the 2018 season. On July 11, 2018, he played in the Triple-A All-Star Game. Bethancourt elected free agency on November 2, 2018.

NC Dinos
On December 12, 2018, Bethancourt signed a one-year, $1 million deal with the NC Dinos of the KBO League. He was waived on July 3, 2019.

Philadelphia Phillies
On January 7, 2020, Bethancourt signed a minor league deal with the Philadelphia Phillies. He became a free agent during the offseason, then re-signed with the Phillies on a minor league contract. Bethancourt joined the Phillies' minor league camp during spring training. On March 28, 2021, the Phillies released him.

Pittsburgh Pirates
On May 1, 2021, Bethancourt signed a minor league contract with the Pittsburgh Pirates organization.

Oakland Athletics
On December 3, 2021, Bethancourt signed a minor league deal with the Oakland Athletics. On April 15, 2022, Bethancourt was added to the Athletics roster for their road trip to Toronto as a COVID-related substitute. He played three innings at first base. It was the first time Bethancourt had appeared in a Major League Baseball game since the 2017 season.

Tampa Bay Rays
On July 9, 2022, the Athletics traded Bethancourt to the Rays for Cal Stevenson and Christian Fernandez. On August 23, 2022, Bethancourt drove in three runs, including a home run,  and pitched a scoreless top of the ninth inning in an 11-1 blowout of the Los Angeles Angels. Bethancourt topped out at 95 mph while giving up two hits and striking out one to close out the game.

References

External links
 

1991 births
Living people
Águilas Cibaeñas players
Atlanta Braves players
Colorado Springs Sky Sox players
Danville Braves players
Dominican Summer League Braves players
El Paso Chihuahuas players
Estrellas Orientales players
Gulf Coast Braves players
Gwinnett Braves players
Indianapolis Indians players
KBO League catchers
Las Vegas Aviators players
Lynchburg Hillcats players
Major League Baseball catchers
Major League Baseball first basemen
Major League Baseball pitchers
Major League Baseball players from Panama
Mississippi Braves players
NC Dinos players
Oakland Athletics players
Panamanian expatriate baseball players in the Dominican Republic
Panamanian expatriate baseball players in the United States
Panamanian expatriate baseball players in South Korea
Rome Braves players
San Diego Padres players
Sportspeople from Panama City
Surprise Saguaros players
Tampa Bay Rays players
Tigres del Licey players
2023 World Baseball Classic players